Widow Haviland's Tavern, also known as Square House Museum, is a historic inn and tavern building located at Rye, Westchester County, New York. It is a frame, gambrel roofed building with portions believed to date to the early 18th century, about 1730.  It opened as a tavern about 1760.  John Adams (1774), George Washington (1789), and General Lafayette (1824) are among the well known customers.  It ceased use as a public house about 1830, then was a private residence until 1903, after which it became the municipal hall.  It has been used since 1964 as a local history museum.

It was added to the National Register of Historic Places in 1974.

See also
National Register of Historic Places listings in southern Westchester County, New York

References

External links
Rye Historical Society: Square House Museum website

Hotel buildings completed in 1730
History museums in New York (state)
Drinking establishments on the National Register of Historic Places in New York (state)
Hotel buildings on the National Register of Historic Places in New York (state)
Museums in Westchester County, New York
Taverns in New York (state)
National Register of Historic Places in Westchester County, New York
Buildings and structures in Rye, New York
Taverns on the National Register of Historic Places in New York (state)
1730 establishments in the Thirteen Colonies
Houses in Westchester County, New York